The Army Medical University, formerly the Third Military Medical University, is a Chinese medical education institution affiliated to the People's Liberation Army (PLA), located in Chongqing.

The Army Medical University was founded in 1954 by the merger of former Sixth and Seventh Medical Universities. The predecessor of the Sixth Medical University was the Military Medical School of 4th Field Army of PLA and the Nanchang Medical College (formerly Zhongzheng Medical College). The Seventh Medical University originated from the Medical School of Taiyue Military Region (later the Medical College of 2nd Field Army). After merging, the school was named "Seventh Military Medical University", and relocated to Shanghai in 1969.  It moved back to Chongqing in 1975, when the Central Military Commission renamed it "Third Military Medical University". In 2017, the institution was renamed "Army Medical University" during the latest Chinese military reform.

Affiliated hospitals
 First Affiliated Hospital (Southwest Hospital)
 Second Affiliated Hospital (Xinqiao Hospital)
 Third Affiliated Hospital (Daping Hospital)

References

External links 
  Official website of Third Military Medical University

Military education and training in China
Universities and colleges in Chongqing
Educational institutions established in 1954
1954 establishments in China
Medical schools in China